Thomas Joseph Deane Bourke (7 February 1815 – 28 February 1875) was an Irish first-class cricketer.

Bourke made his first-class debut for Marylebone Cricket Club (MCC) against Hampshire in 1843. This was his only first-class match for MCC.

In 1844 Bourke made his debut for Hampshire against Marylebone Cricket Club. In 1845 Bourke played two further first-class matches for Hampshire against the Marylebone Cricket Club and Petworth Cricket Club.

External links
Thomas Bourke at Cricinfo
Thomas Bourke at CricketArchive

1815 births
1875 deaths
Irish cricketers
Marylebone Cricket Club cricketers
Hampshire cricketers